Thymiatris cephalochra is a moth in the family Xyloryctidae. It was described by Oswald Bertram Lower in 1894. It is found in Australia, where it has been recorded from New South Wales and Queensland.

References

Thymiatris
Moths described in 1894